Agrioglypta eurytusalis is a moth in the family Crambidae described by Francis Walker in 1859. It is found in southern India, Sri Lanka, Borneo,  Cambodia, Thailand, Taiwan, Japan and Australia, where it has been recorded from northern Queensland.

The wingspan is about 30 mm. The forewings have a pattern of white and brown bands and triangles. The hindwings are white with a brown margin.

References

Moths described in 1859
Spilomelinae
Moths of Asia
Moths of Australia